Maruca vitrata  is a pantropical insect pest of leguminous crops like pigeon pea, cowpea, mung bean and soybean. Its common names include the maruca pod borer, bean pod borer, soybean pod borer, mung moth, and the legume pod borer. The species was first described by Johan Christian Fabricius in 1787.

It can cause losses of 20–80% on the harvests of cowpeas.

Its feeding sites on plants are flower buds, flowers and young pods. In some cases early instars feed on flower peduncles and young stems.

Methods for control

Biological 
Some parasitoids have been shown to serve as a biological control for Maruca vitrata. Parasitoid wasps families include Braconidae and Ichneumonidae; some parasitoid flies in the Tachinidae are also natural enemies of the moth. M. vitrata prefers to lay its eggs on the flowering bodies of the cowpea plant. Efforts have been made to deter M. vitrata from reproducing on the plant ranging from pesticides to a chemical specifically designed to sterilize the moth.

Distribution

Worldwide in the tropics. Asia, Africa, North, South and Central America, the Caribbean, Europe, Australia & Oceania.

References

External links
 OISAT
 mbarnes
 cabicompendium
 
 Maruca in Australia
 Network for Genetic Improvement of Cowpea for All (NGICA)

Spilomelinae
Moths described in 1787
Lepidoptera of Cameroon
Moths of Madagascar
Lepidoptera of the Democratic Republic of the Congo
Moths of Japan
Moths of Mauritius
Moths of Seychelles
Moths of Réunion
Moths of Africa
Pantropical fauna
Moths of North America
Moths of South America
Moths of the Caribbean